George II of Pomerania (30 January 1582, in Barth – 27 March 1617, in Seebuckow, Rügenwalde (after 1945 Bukowo Morskie, Darlowo)) was a non-reigning duke of Pomerania.  He administered the district of Rügenwalde from 1606 to 1617 jointly with his brother Bogislaw XIV.

Life 
George was a member of the last generation of the ruling House of Griffins in Pomerania.  He was born in 1582 as a younger son of Duke Bogislaw XIII and his first wife, Clara of Brunswick.  George and his brothers agreed on the division of the inheritance after the death of their father.  Following the agreement of 1 October 1606 the eldest brother, Philip II (1573–1618) was the reigning Duke of Pomerania-Stettin, Francis (1577–1620) was a Protestant Bishop of Cammin. George together with his older brother Bogislaw XIV (1580–1637) received the district of Rügenwalde.  The youngest brother Ulrich initially received only an annual pension.

In Rügenwalde, George dealt exclusively with hunting and took no part in the affairs of state. He lost sight in his left eye when firing a gun.

Duke George remained unmarried. He died in 1617 in Buckow in his district Rügenwalde and was buried in the Castle Church in Szczecin.

Ancestors

See also 
 List of Pomeranian duchies and dukes

References 
 Martin Wehrmann: Genealogie des pommerschen Herzogshauses, Verlag Leon Sauniers Buchhandlung, Szczecin 1937, p. 128.

External links 
 George II at www.ruegenwalde.com

House of Griffins
Dukes of Pomerania
1582 births
1617 deaths
17th-century German people